Lewis Fenton (1780 – 27 November 1833) was a British politician.

Fenton lived in Huddersfield and served as a captain in the 55th Regiment of Foot.  At the 1832 UK general election, he stood in Huddersfield as a Whig, and won election.  In Parliament, he supported the Factory Act 1833.  He died in November 1833, still in office.  According to the Sunday Times, he died by falling from a window after standing on a chair to get a better view of his turnip patch.

References

1780 births
1833 deaths
Accidental deaths in England
Members of the Parliament of the United Kingdom for English constituencies
People from Huddersfield
UK MPs 1832–1835
Whig (British political party) MPs for English constituencies